Kim James Newman (born 31 July 1959) is an English journalist, film critic and fiction writer. Recurring interests visible in his work include film history and horror fiction—both of which he attributes to seeing Tod Browning's Dracula at the age of eleven—and alternative fictional versions of history. He has won the Bram Stoker Award, the International Horror Guild Award, and the BSFA award.

Early life
Kim Newman was born 31 July 1959 in Brixton, London, the son of Bryan Michael Newman and Julia Christen Newman, both potters. His sister, Sasha, was born in 1961, and their mother died in 2003. Newman attended "a progressive kindergarten and a primary school in Brixton, and then Huish Episcopi County Primary School in Langport, Somerset." In 1966 the family moved to Aller, Somerset. He was educated at Dr. Morgan's Grammar School for Boys in Bridgwater. While he attended, the school merged with two others to become Haygrove Comprehensive. He graduated from the University of Sussex with an English degree in 1980, and set a short story, Angel Down, Sussex (1999) in the area. Newman acted in school plays and with the Bridgwater Youth Theatre.

Non-fiction

Early in his career, Newman was a journalist for the magazines City Limits and Knave.

Newman's first two books were both non-fiction; Ghastly Beyond Belief: The Science Fiction and Fantasy Book of Quotations (1985), co-written with his friend Neil Gaiman, is a light-hearted tribute to entertainingly bad prose in fantastic fiction, and Nightmare Movies: A Critical History of the Horror Film, 1968–88 (1988) is a serious history of horror films.  An expanded edition, an update of his overview of post-1968 genre cinema, was published in 2011.

Nightmare Movies was followed by Wild West Movies: Or How the West Was Found, Won, Lost, Lied About, Filmed and Forgotten (1990) and Millennium Movies: End of the World Cinema (1999). Newman's non-fiction also includes the BFI Companion to Horror (1996).

Newman and Stephen Jones jointly edited Horror: 100 Best Books, the 1988 horror volume in Xanadu's 100 Best series and Horror: Another 100 Best Books, a 2005 sequel from Carroll & Graf, U.S. publisher of the series. The books comprise 100 essays by 100 horror writers about 100 horror books and both won the annual Bram Stoker Award for Best Non-Fiction.

Newman is a contributing editor to the UK film magazine Empire, as well as writing the monthly segment, "Kim Newman's Video Dungeon" in which he gives often scathing reviews of recently released straight-to-video horror films. He contributes to Rotten Tomatoes, Venue, Video Watchdog ('The Perfectionist's Guide to Fantastic Video') and Sight & Sound. Newman is the author of the Doctor Who entry in the British Film Institute's book series on TV Classics. In 2018, Newman became the chief writer on the BBC Four documentary series Mark Kermode's Secrets of Cinema.

Newman participated in the 2012 Sight & Sound critics' poll, where he listed his ten favorite films as follows: 2001: A Space Odyssey, Apocalypse Now, A Canterbury Tale, Céline and Julie Go Boating, Citizen Kane, Duck Amuck, Let's Scare Jessica to Death, Mulholland Drive, Notorious, and To Have and Have Not.

Fiction

A feature of Newman's fiction is his fondness for reinterpreting historical figures (particularly from the entertainment industry) and other authors' characters in new settings, either realistic alternate-history or outright fantasy. Some of these characters (e.g. Dracula) are easily recognised. Many more, particularly minor characters, are obscure except to knowledgeable readers. An example is the appearance of the American John Reid, who owned a silver mine and exported silver bullets to Great Britain in Anno Dracula (a reference to the Lone Ranger). Another is the American actor named Kent cast as "Hercules" in an Italian production of the same name (apparently a reference to both George Reeves and Steve Reeves [no relation] who played Superman and Hercules, respectively) in the novel Dracula Cha Cha Cha a.k.a. Judgment of Tears: Anno Dracula 1959.

Novels
Newman's first published novel was The Night Mayor (1989), set in a virtual reality, based on old black-and-white detective movies. In the same year, as "Jack Yeovil", he began contributing to a series of novels published by Games Workshop, set in the world of their Warhammer and Dark Future wargaming and role-playing games.  Games Workshop's fiction imprint Black Flame returned the Dark Future books to print in 2006, publishing Demon Download, Krokodil Tears, Comeback Tour and the expanded, 250-page version of the short story "Route 666".

Anno Dracula was published in 1992. The novel is set in 1888, during Jack the Ripper's killing spree—but a different 1888, in which Dracula became the ruler of England. In the novel, fictional characters—not only from Dracula, but also from other works of Victorian era fiction—appear alongside historical persons. One major character, the vampire Geneviève Dieudonné, had previously appeared (in a different setting) in his Warhammer novels. (Newman has stated there are three versions of Geneviève: the Warhammer version, the Anno Dracula version and a Diogenes Club version who appears in the Seven Stars collection of linked stories and The Secret Files of the Diogenes Club.)

Anno Dracula was followed by the Anno Dracula series of novels and shorter works, that followed the same alternative history, including The Bloody Red Baron (set in World War I) and Dracula Cha Cha Cha (titled Judgment of Tears: Anno Dracula 1959 in the US). Some of the short stories are available online; see below. The fourth novel in the series was published in 2013 as Johnny Alucard.

Other novels include Life's Lottery (1999), in which the protagonist's life story is determined by the reader's choices (an adult version of the Choose Your Own Adventure series of children's books), The Quorum (1994), Jago (1991) and Bad Dreams (1990).

Newman wrote a Doctor Who novella, Time and Relative in 2001.

Short stories
Newman is a prolific writer of short stories; his first published story was "Dreamers", which appeared in Interzone in 1984. His short story collections include The Original Dr. Shade, and Other Stories (1994), Famous Monsters (1995), Seven Stars (2000), Where the Bodies are Buried (2000), Unforgivable Stories (2000), The Man from the Diogenes Club (2006), The Secret Files of the Diogenes Club (2007) and Mysteries of the Diogenes Club (2010). There is also Back in the USSA (1997), a collection of stories co-written with Eugene Byrne, set in an alternate history where the United States had a communist revolution in the early twentieth century and Russia did not.

Many of his stories—notably those collected in Seven Stars, The Man from the Diogenes Club, The Secret Files of the Diogenes Club, and Mysteries of the Diogenes Club—feature agents of the Diogenes Club, the gentlemen's club created by Arthur Conan Doyle for the Sherlock Holmes story "The Adventure of the Greek Interpreter". In Newman's stories, it is a cover for a top-secret establishment of the British government, described as "an institution that quietly existed to cope with matters beyond the purview of regular police and intelligence services". 

One sequence emphasizes the adventures during the 1970s of psychic investigator Richard Jeperson; the stories pay homage to various aspects of 1970s British society, through adventures reminiscent of '70s television series such as The Avengers and Department S. (A version of the Diogenes Club also appears in the Anno Dracula series, complete with an alternative version of Jeperson. The Diogenes Club series, conversely, sometimes includes alternative versions of characters who first appeared in the Anno Dracula series.)

He contributed two short stories to Shadows Over Innsmouth (as Kim Newman and as Jack Yeovil), an anthology based on H P Lovecraft's The Shadow Over Innsmouth. The short story "Famous Monsters", in which a Martian left over from the invasion in H. G. Wells' The War of the Worlds gets a job in Hollywood, was included on an information package sent to Mars by a US–Russian probe in 1994. 

In 2011, Newman published Moriarty: The Hound of the D'Urbervilles, a collection of seven stories about Professor James Moriarty, as told by his assistant, Colonel Sebastian Moran. Both Moriarty and Moran are developments of characters created by Sir Arthur Conan Doyle in his Sherlock Holmes novels and stories; Moriarty appeared in "The Final Problem" and The Valley of Fear and Moran appeared in "The Adventure of the Empty House", which also mentions Moriarty. Each of the stories in this collection satirizes a major story of the Sherlock Holmes canon. The seven stories are:
 "A Volume in Vermillion", which introduces Colonel Moran to Professor Moriarty and develops plot elements and characters from A Study in Scarlet, blending them with plot elements and characters from Riders of the Purple Sage by Zane Grey.
 "A Shambles in Belgravia", inspired by "A Scandal in Bohemia" and the thrillers of Anthony Hope, with a featured role for Irene Adler.
 "The Red Planet League", inspired not only by "The Red-Headed League" but also by The War of the Worlds and "The Crystal Egg" by H. G. Wells, who makes a cameo appearance.
 "The Hound of the D'Urbervilles", a synthesis of ideas from The Hound of the Baskervilles and Tess of the d'Urbervilles by Thomas Hardy.
 "The Adventure of the Six Maledictions", inspired by "The Adventure of the Six Napoleons" with mentions of The Jewel of Seven Stars by Bram Stoker and "The Green Eye of the Yellow God" by J. Milton Hayes.
 "The Adventure of the Greek Invertebrate", inspired by "The Greek Interpreter".
 "The Problem of the Final Adventure", inspired by "The Final Problem" and "The Adventure of the Empty House".

Selected fiction

Novels
 The Night Mayor (1989)
 Bad Dreams (1990)
 Jago (1991)
 The Quorum (1994)
 Life's Lottery (1999)
 Anno Dracula series
 Anno Dracula (1992)
 The Bloody Red Baron (1995)
 Dracula Cha Cha Cha (also published as Judgment of Tears: Anno Dracula 1959) (1998)
 Johnny Alucard (2013)
 One Thousand Monsters (2017)
 Anno Dracula 1999: Daikaiju (2019)
 Time and Relative (2001)
 An English Ghost Story (2014)
 The Secrets of Drearcliffe Grange School (2015)
The Haunting of Drearcliff Grange School (2018)
 Angels of Music (2016)
Something More Than Night (2021)

Short story collections
 The Original Dr. Shade, and Other Stories (1994)
 Famous Monsters (1995)
 Back in the USSA (1997) (with Eugene Byrne)
 Seven Stars (2000)
 Where the Bodies are Buried (2000)
 Unforgivable Stories (2000)
 Dead Travel Fast (2005)
 Diogenes Club series
 The Man from the Diogenes Club (2006)
 The Secret Files of the Diogenes Club (2007)
 Mysteries of the Diogenes Club (2010)
 The Man From the Diogenes Club (2017)
 Moriarty: The Hound of the D'Urbervilles (Titan Books, 2011)

Comics
 Anno Dracula – 1895: Seven Days in Mayhem (Titan Comics, 2017, 5 issues) with artist Paul McCaffrey.

As "Jack Yeovil"
 Warhammer setting
 Drachenfels (1989)
 Beasts in Velvet (1991)
 Genevieve Undead (1993, three novellas published as a single book)
 Silver Nails (2002, short stories)
 The Vampire Genevieve (2005, compilation of the above four books)
 Dark Future setting
 Krokodil Tears (1990)
 Demon Download (1990)
 Route 666 (1993)
 Comeback Tour (1991)
 Orgy of the Blood Parasites (1994)
 "The Big Fish" in Shadows over Innsmouth (1994)

Awards
 The Horror Writers of America Bram Stoker Award for Best Non Fiction, shared 1989 (Horror: 100 Best Books, edited by Stephen Jones and Newman)
 The Horror Writers of America Bram Stoker Award for Best Non Fiction, shared 2005 (Horror: Another 100 Best Books, eds. Jones and Newman)
 The British Science Fiction Award for Best Short Fiction (The Original Dr Shade)
 The Dracula Society's Children of the Night Award for Best Novel (Anno Dracula)
 The Fiction Award of the Lord Ruthven Assembly (Anno Dracula)
 International Horror Guild Award for Best Novel (Anno Dracula)
 International Horror Guild Award for Best Novella (Coppola's Dracula)
 Prix Ozone for Best Novel (Anno Dracula)
 The British Fantasy Award for Best Collection, 2000 (Where the Bodies Are Buried)

Newman has been nominated for the Rondo Hatton Classic Horror Award six times and for the World Fantasy Award seven times.

Notes

References

Bibliography 
 Clute, John and John Grant. The Encyclopedia of Fantasy. New York: St Martin's Press, 1997. .

External links
  – official site
 EOFFTV: Kim Newman Archive – Newman's film related writings archive (ongoing project)
 
 
 
 Original publication date unknown.

1959 births
British alternative history writers
Alumni of the University of Sussex
English film critics
English horror writers
Cthulhu Mythos writers
English short story writers
English science fiction writers
British film historians
Film theorists
Living people
Writers from London
People from Brixton
People from South Somerset (district)
Warhammer Fantasy writers
20th-century English novelists
21st-century British novelists
20th-century British short story writers
21st-century British short story writers
British psychological fiction writers
English male novelists
20th-century pseudonymous writers
21st-century pseudonymous writers